The Samuel Goldwyn Theatre is a screening-only movie theater named after filmmaker Samuel Goldwyn.

It is located at 8949 Wilshire Boulevard, Beverly Hills, California, at headquarters of the Academy of Motion Picture Arts and Sciences (AMPAS). The Academy uses this theater each January most years to announce the nominations for its Academy Awards.

The following films premiered in the Samuel Goldwyn Theatre: Terminator 2: Judgment Day (1992), Raju Chacha (2000), Gladiator (2000), A Beautiful Mind (2001), Black Hawk Down (2001), A.I. Artificial Intelligence (2001), Moulin Rouge! (2001), Narc (2002), Wimbledon (2004), Eternal Sunshine of the Spotless Mind (2004), 127 Hours (2010), The Descendants (2011), and Babylon (2022).

Notes and references

External links 
The theater on the Academy Awards official website

Academy of Motion Picture Arts and Sciences
Buildings and structures in Beverly Hills, California
Cinemas and movie theaters in Los Angeles
Theatres in Los Angeles County, California
Cinema of Southern California
Wilshire Boulevard